Gabriel Spilar, formerly Gabriel Špilár (Košice, 15 December 1980) is a Slovak former professional ice hockey forward.

Personal life
Špilár changed his Slovak name to Spilar in 2009, he explained the change to Slovak journalists as because of not having good memories of his stepfather and wanting to distinguish his own name.

Career statistics

Regular season and playoffs

Awards and honours

References

External links

1980 births
Living people
Sportspeople from Košice
Slovak ice hockey right wingers
North Bay Centennials players
HC Košice players
HKM Zvolen players
HC Sparta Praha players
HC Slovan Bratislava players
PSG Berani Zlín players
MsHK Žilina players
Barys Nur-Sultan players
Espoo Blues players
HK Nitra players
Kazzinc-Torpedo players
Vaasan Sport players
MHk 32 Liptovský Mikuláš players
HK Dukla Michalovce players
Slovak expatriate ice hockey players in Finland
Slovak expatriate ice hockey players in Canada
Slovak expatriate ice hockey players in the Czech Republic
Expatriate ice hockey players in Kazakhstan
Slovak expatriate sportspeople in Kazakhstan